Heelsum is a village in the Dutch province of Gelderland. It is located in the municipality of Renkum, west of Arnhem.

Part of the Battle of Arnhem was fought in and around Heelsum. The initial British landings were carried out just north of the village.

History 
The village was first mentioned around 1160 as in Helessem, and means "settlement of Hele (person)". Helsum is an esdorp which developed in the Middle Ages near the brook Heelsumse beek. It became a separate parish in 1517.

The Dutch Reformed church was built in 1517 by the lady of the castle Margaretha van Homoet. It was expanded in 1859. The Catholic community wanted an own church as well. On 1 April 1950 announced plans to built a church, however the municipality preferred villas at the location. The church was finally constructed in 1961, however it was decommissioned in 2018.

Heelsum was home to 120 people in 1840. Hotel Klein Zwitserland (Little Switzerland) was built in 1905 in Swiss chalet style in the middle of Wilhelmina park. 

On 17 September 1944, the 1st Airborne Division was dropped in Heelsum near Oosterbeek. The landing was unopposed, however they ran into an armoured tank division of the Germans on the way to Arnhem. On 9 September 1945, the Airborne monument was revealed in Heelsum.

Heelsum and Renkum have formed a single urban area, however both are considered separate villages.

Gallery

References

Populated places in Gelderland
Renkum